Roman Heydarov (born 24 January 1999) is an Azerbaijani karateka. He won one of the bronze medals in the men's individual kata event at the 2019 European Games held in Minsk, Belarus.

In 2018, he competed in the men's individual kata event at the World Karate Championships held in Madrid, Spain.

In June 2021, he competed at the World Olympic Qualification Tournament held in Paris, France hoping to qualify for the 2020 Summer Olympics in Tokyo, Japan. In November 2021, he competed at the 2021 World Karate Championships held in Dubai, United Arab Emirates.

He competed in the men's kata at the 2022 World Games held in Birmingham, United States. He won one of the bronze medals in the men's individual kata event at the 2021 Islamic Solidarity Games held in Konya, Turkey.

Achievements

References 

Living people
1999 births
Place of birth missing (living people)
Azerbaijani male karateka
European Games bronze medalists for Azerbaijan
Karateka at the 2019 European Games
European Games medalists in karate
Islamic Solidarity Games medalists in karate
Islamic Solidarity Games competitors for Azerbaijan
Competitors at the 2022 World Games
21st-century Azerbaijani people